Ajiaz Hussain Shah Bukhari is a Pakistani politician who had been a Member of the Provincial Assembly of Sindh, from May 2013 to May 2018.

Political career
He was elected to the Provincial Assembly of Sindh as a candidate of Pakistan Peoples Party from Constituency PS-53 Tando Muhammad  Khan-cum-Hyderabad in 2013 Pakistani general election.

References

Living people
Sindh MPAs 2013–2018
Pakistan People's Party politicians
Year of birth missing (living people)